Chernikovo is a rural locality (a selo) in Starooskolsky District, Belgorod Oblast, Russia. The population was 245 as of 2010. There are 14 streets.

Geography 
Chernikovo is located 21 km southeast of Stary Oskol (the district's administrative centre) by road. Ozerki is the nearest rural locality.

References 

Rural localities in Starooskolsky District